Madushika Methtananda (born 24 July 1994) is a Sri Lankan cricketer. In March 2019, she was named in Sri Lanka's squad for their series against England. She made her Women's Twenty20 International cricket (WT20I) debut for Sri Lanka against England Women on 28 March 2019.

In October 2021, she was named as one of five reserve players in Sri Lanka's team for the 2021 Women's Cricket World Cup Qualifier tournament in Zimbabwe. In January 2022, she was named as one of four reserve players in Sri Lanka's team for the 2022 Commonwealth Games Cricket Qualifier tournament in Malaysia.

References

External links
 

1994 births
Living people
Sri Lankan women cricketers
Sri Lanka women Twenty20 International cricketers
Place of birth missing (living people)